99 Percent – Civic Voice (99%) is a left-wing populist political party in Slovakia inspired by the Occupy Wall Street movement. It is jointly led by manager  Alena Dušatková, radio journalist Pavol Pavlík, and lawyer and former police investigator Peter Vačok.

According to opinion polls, the party was expected to  gain parliamentary representation in the 2012 parliamentary election; but it failed to do so, with only 1.58% of the vote.

The party's registration turned into a scandal when it was revealed that many of the 16,000 signatures submitted were discovered to be fraudulent.

References

External links
Official website

Social democratic parties in Slovakia
Political parties established in 2011